is a composer, pianist, critic, conductor, and author.

Biography
Yuji Takahashi studied under Roh Ogura and Minao Shibata at the Toho Gakuen School of Music. In 1960, he made his debut as a pianist by performing Bo Nilsson's Quantitäten. He received a grant from The Ford Foundation to study in West Berlin under Iannis Xenakis in 1962 and stayed in Europe until 1966, also stayed in New York under Rockefeller Foundation scholarship until 1972.
 
He founded 'Suigyu Gakudan' (Water Buffalo band)  in 1978 as introducing international protest songs, starting from Thailand, mainly performing Asian songs, also published monthly journal 'Suigyu Tsushin'.

Selected works
 Time (tape)
 Chromamorphe I (fl, hrn in F, trp in C, trb, vib, vn, cb)
 Chromamorphe II (pf)
 6 Stoicheia (4vn)
 Rosace I (amplified vn)
 Rosace II (pf)
 Operation Euler (2 or 3ob)
 Metathesis I (pf)
 Manangali (didactic piece for women's chorus) 
 Three Poems of Mao Tse-Tung (pf or vo[cho], pf)
 Chained Hands in Prayer (pf)
 For You I Sing This Song (cl in B flat, vn, vc, pf) (1976)
 Ji(t) (fl, pf)
 Sieben Rosen hat ein Strauch (vn)
 Kwanju, May 1980 (pf)
 The Pain of the Wandering Wind (pf)
 Like a Water-Buffalo (acc)
 Turn the Corner of the Morning (perc)
 Thread Cogwheels (koto, orch)
 Insomnia (vn, hp)
 Bed Story (vo, koto)
 Sea of Mud (cho, perc)
 Like Swans Leaving the Lake, for viola and accordion (1995)
 Mimi no ho, Sail of the Ears, for Shō, viola and reciter (1994)
 Viola of Dmitri Shostakovich, for viola solo (2002)

Selected discography
Yuji Takahashi has over 100 Japanese releases to his credit.

As pianist
The complete works of Arnold Schoenberg, Anton Webern and Alban Berg, music by Messiaen (solo pieces, also Visions de l'Amen with Peter Serkin), Iannis Xenakis, John Cage, Rzewski, Na, Cornelius Cardew, Takemitsu, the Indonesian composer Slamet Abdul Sjukur, Earle Brown and Roger Reynolds.

J.S. Bach's The Art of the Fugue (BWV 1080), the E minor Toccata and the complete Inventions and Sinfonias; two volumes of Satie's solo piano music; a Sonata of Wilhelm Friedemann Bach and Marche et Reminiscences pour mon dernier voyage of Rossini.

As conductor
Music by Iannis Xenakis, José Maceda, Sofia Gubaidulina, John Zorn and Edgard Varèse.

Suigyu Gakudan
 1984 Kyugyo (Cassette) 
 2001 Suigyu Gakudan (CD)

Award
 2006 Foundation for Contemporary Arts Grants to Artists Award.

References

Bio in Bach Cantatas

External links
Official website in Japanese
Suigyu in Japanese
Discogs

1938 births
20th-century classical composers
20th-century classical pianists
20th-century Japanese male musicians
21st-century classical composers
21st-century classical pianists
21st-century Japanese male musicians
Contemporary classical music performers
Japanese classical composers
Japanese classical pianists
Japanese contemporary classical composers
Japanese male classical composers
Japanese male classical pianists
Japanese male writers
Living people
Toho Gakuen School of Music alumni